The Helena Micropolitan Statistical Area, as defined by the United States Census Bureau, is an area consisting of two counties in western Montana, anchored by the city of Helena.

As of the 2014 census estimate, the MSA had a population of 77,414, a 16% increase over the 2000 census.

Counties
Lewis and Clark 
Jefferson

Communities

Places with more than 25,000 inhabitants
Helena (Principal city)

Places with 5,000 to 10,000 inhabitants
Helena Valley Southeast CDP
Helena Valley West Central CDP

Places with 1,000 to 5,000 inhabitants
Boulder
Clancy CDP
East Helena
Helena Valley Northeast CDP
Helena Valley Northwest CDP
Helena West Side CDP
Lincoln CDP
Montana City CDP
Whitehall

Places with less than 1,000 inhabitants
Augusta CDP
Basin CDP
Cardwell CDP 
Jefferson City CDP

Demographics
The 2012 U.S. Census estimate of the Helena area is 76,277. As of the census of 2000, there were 65,765 people, 26,597 households, and 17,813 families residing within the MSA. The racial makeup of the MSA was 95.34% White, 0.19% African American, 1.92% Native American, 0.50% Asian, 0.05% Pacific Islander, 0.38% from other races, and 1.62% from two or more races. Hispanic or Latino of any race were 1.51% of the population.

The median income for a household in the MSA was $39,433, and the median income for a family was $47,839. Males had a median income of $34,134 versus $24,486 for females. The per capita income for the MSA was $18,507.

See also
Montana census statistical areas

References

 
Lewis and Clark County, Montana
Jefferson County, Montana